"The World in My Hands" is a 1995 song by German Eurodance project Snap!. It was released as the third single from their third studio album, Welcome to Tomorrow (1994), and features vocals by American singer Summer (a.k.a. Paula Brown). Although it didn't reach the same level of success as the project's earlier singles, it was a notable hit in Europe, reaching the top 30 in Belgium and the top 40 in the Netherlands. On the European Dance Radio Chart, the song peaked at number nine in October 1995.

Critical reception
British magazine Music Week wrote, "The video for this single took three months to make. Chances of seeing it seem slim, though, as this is a dreary, down-tempo effort from the Europopsters." Alan Jones commented, "Snap! have changed since the early days when they perfected the male rap/female singer combination which has proves such a potent force in Eurodance. Now, they can confidently expect an 11th Top 20 hit with The World In My Hands, a brooding mid-tempo workout, with some almost tribal samples."

Track listing

 7" single, Germany (1995)
"The World in My Hands" (7" Mix) — 3:55
"The World in My Hands" (We Are One) — 4:21

 12", Germany (1995)
"The World in My Hands" (12" Mix) — 5:01
"The World in My Hands" (Dub Mix) — 5:55

 CD single, Germany (1995)
"The World in My Hands" (7" Mix) — 3:55
"The World in My Hands" (We Are One)" — 4:21

 CD maxi, Europe (1995)
"The World in My Hands" (7" Mix) — 3:55
"The World in My Hands" (12" Mix) — 5:01
"The World in My Hands" (Extended Instrumental Mix) — 5:15
"The World in My Hands" (We Are One) — 4:21
"The World in My Hands" (Dub Mix) — 6:27
"Syn Perk Dump" (S 3200) — 0:23

Charts

References

Snap! songs
1995 songs
1995 singles
Ariola Records singles
Arista Records singles
Electro songs
English-language German songs